Peter Bander van Duren (30 July 1930, in Cologne – 21 April 2004) was a British writer on heraldry and orders of knighthood.

Biography 
Peter Bander immigrated to the United Kingdom from Germany and became a British citizen in 1962.

In 1976, he changed his name by deed poll to Peter Bander van Duren, adding a slight alteration of his mother's maiden name, von Duren, to his father's surname.

Bander van Duren worked as a teacher in a borstal, a prison for youth, and in Edith Cavell School, a secondary school in a deprived part of Islington, and then taught Religious & Moral Education at Wall Hall Callege, Cambridge Institute of Education, a teachers' training college in Aldenham, Herts. In 1966 he became co-founder and joint-Managing Director of Colin Smythe, a small British publishing house.

Works 
A Roman Catholic, Bander van Duren wrote several books on heraldry, some of them in coöperation with Bruno Bernard Heim or Archbishop Hygenius Eugene Cardinale, the Apostolic Delegate to the United Kingdom.

Honours 
 Knight Grand Cross with Gold Star, Sacred Military Constantinian Order of Saint George of the Royal House of Bourbon-Two Sicilies.

Bibliography
 One for the Road (Colin Smythe, 1966) 
 Two for the Road (Colin Smythe, 1967) 
 (editor) Looking Forward to the Seventies: A Blueprint for Education (Colin Smythe, 1968) 
 The Prophecies of St Malachy & St Columbkille (Colin Smythe, 1969, reprinted 2005) 
 Carry on Talking. How Dead are the Voices? (Colin Smythe, 1972)  [US edition titled Voices from the Tapes: Recordings from the Other World (Drake Publishers, 1973)]
 Editor of Bruno Bernard Heim, Armorial Bruno B. Heim (Van Duren Publishers, 1981) 
 Editor of H.E.Cardinale, Orders of Knighthood, Awards and the Holy See (3rd edition, Van Duren Publishers, 1985) 
 Editor of Jacques Martin, Heraldry in the Vatican / L'Araldica in Vaticano / Heraldik im Vatikan (Van Duren Publishers, 1987) 
 The Cross on the Sword (Van Duren Publishers, 1987) 
 Orders of Knighthood and of Merit (Colin Smythe, 1995) 

1930 births
2004 deaths
Ecclesiastical heraldry
Heraldic artists
German Roman Catholics
Writers from Cologne
People from the Rhine Province
German emigrants to England
Naturalised citizens of the United Kingdom